Ballakermeen High School is a coeducational comprehensive secondary school based on a single site in Douglas, on the Isle of Man.

History

Ballakermeen formed part of HMS St George during the Second World War. This was the Royal Navy's only Continuous Service Training Establishment, where cadets would receive an education comparable to that of a Secondary School. It was opened in September 1939.

Starting at the age of 16, the cadets who passed through HMS St George received a concentrated 15 months training course in the Seaman, Signal and Wireless Telegraphy Communications branches. A staff of over 300 officers provided the educational background to the practical and technical training for the cadets.

To give breadth to their education, English subjects and Naval history were taught, with lectures additionally being devoted to mathematics and its service application to science and navigation, with emphasis placed on the practical rather than the academical aspects of the subjects. Classroom work at Ballakermeen was supplemented by instructional films and practical experiments. Separate classes were formed for cadets of different branches of the service, with each class consisting of 25-30 cadets under the charge of a qualified Naval Schoolmaster.

The officer in charge of Ballakermeen was Captain A.J. Lowe and by the end of the war 8,677 cadets had passed through the establishment.

HMS St George was paid off on Thursday, December 20, 1945, with the officers and ratings leaving the Isle of Man and relocating to HMS Ganges, Shotley. Following the decommissioning ceremony and to commemorate the association of Ballakermeen with the Royal Navy a signal mast, which had been in use in the Signal School, was presented by Captain Stevens-Guille to the Isle of Man Education Authority. It was hoped that the mast would have been erected in the grounds of the school, and a brass plate commemorating the role the school had played during the war years.

In a letter thanking the Authority Captain Stevens-Guille wrote:

Current use
The school used to be a Junior High School where pupils attended from the age of 11 to 14 and they would then go to a Senior High School such as St Ninians. Both schools became full high schools.

It currently has 1700+ students aged 11–18, making it the larger of the two secondary schools in Douglas in terms of student numbers and the largest on the island (St Ninian's High School is the other secondary school in Douglas). The school offers GCSEs, BTECs and City and Guilds qualifications for study. The sixth form department of the school (renovated and extended during 2013-2014 period) offers A-level qualifications. Facilities at the school include a swimming pool, sports hall, ICT suites, laboratories and a theatre.

The school was used as a location in the 2006 British Spy film Stormbreaker.

In November 2014, work began on a new £3.2m three-storey extension to accommodate Ballakermeen's 300 sixth form students.

Performance 
As a Manx school, Ballakermeen High School is not subject to inspection by Ofsted. Instead, schools are evaluated using a process called 'school self-review and evaluation'. Ballakermeen High School was most recently evaluated in April 2018, and was mostly found to be either 'effective' or 'very effective'.

Notable former pupils
 Mark Cavendish, professional road cyclist
 Bill Henderson, former member of the House of Keys for Douglas North and currently (2020) a member of the Legislative Council of the Isle of Man.
 Joe Locke, actor best known for portraying Charlie Spring in Netflix series Heartstopper
 Martyn Quayle, the former member of the House of Keys for Middle, who previously held the position of Minister of Tourism and Leisure in the Isle of Man Government
 Paul Quine, Member of the House of Keys

References

External links
 Ballakermeen High School

Schools in the Isle of Man
Buildings and structures in Douglas, Isle of Man
Educational institutions established in 1939
1939 establishments in the Isle of Man
Secondary schools in the United Kingdom
Secondary schools on the Isle of Man